This is a list of television networks and stations in Indonesia. For 27 years, Indonesians could only watch one television channel TVRI. In 1989, the government finally allowed RCTI to broadcast as the first private television network in Indonesia, although only people who had a satellite dish and decoder could watch.

National networks and channels

Free-to-air 
Depending on types of broadcast, free-to-air television networks and stations can be received by either using a UHF/VHF antenna or free-to-air satellite dish.

The following lists free-to-air television networks, sort by launch date and ownership. Since the enactment of Act No. 32 of 2002 on Broadcasting (Undang-Undang No. 32 Tahun 2002 tentang Penyiaran), all private terrestrial television broadcasts licences are granted only to local television stations. Any television entities that wish to broadcast nationally must affiliate with other local stations.

Terrestrial 
 Major networks (networks whose coverage includes cities and regencies in all time zones of Indonesia)

 Minor networks (networks whose coverage includes only several cities/regencies in one or two time zones) and regional networks (networks whose coverage includes only several cities/regencies in one region)

 Television station groups (media groups whose members are local television stations, but which do not air joint programs at the same time or simultaneously as television networks do)

Satellite

Non-profit

For profit  

 Al-Bahjah TV
 Al-Iman TV
 Ahsan TV
 Antara TV
 AQL TV
 Ashiil TV
 Bali United TV
 Drakor Plus
 eLKISI TV
 Fatwa TV
 FTV
 HCBN
 Hijrah TV
 Hope Channel
 I Am Channel
 Indonesian a TV
 Insan Belajar
 Insan Qur'ani
 Insan TV
 Izzah TV
 K-Drama
 Lejel Home Shopping
 M Cine Channel
 Madani TV
 Maleo TV
 M Channel
 MGI TV
 MTA TV
 Muadz TV
 More TV
 Niaga TV
 Persija TV
 Pijar TV
 Rasyaad TV
 Reformed 21
 Rodja TV
 Salam TV
 Saling Sapa TV
 Sinema Indonesia
 Spacetoon
 Spacetoon Plus
 Surau TV
 Tawaf TV
 TV In
 TVP
 TV Desa
 TV Mu
 TV MUI
 U-Channel
 Wesal TV

Pay channels

General 
The following list are channels intended for Indonesian market and available in more than one pay provider.

Premium 
The following list are channels available exclusively in one pay provider or more than one provider in the same ownership.

Television stations by province 

Due to the unclear distinction of 'television network', 'local bureau', 'regional station' of a television network and 'local television station' in practice, the lists below only includes TVRI stations, independent stations, and stations affiliated (which were formerly independent) with one of the networks formed after the Broadcasting Act signed into law while still retaining their original name. Channels are in analog and it was migrated into digital in 2022.

North Sumatra 
 Medan

 Pematangsiantar

West Sumatra 
 Padang

Riau 
 Pekanbaru

 Tembilahan

Riau Islands

South Sumatra 
 Palembang

Lampung 
 Bandar Lampung

Banten

Jakarta

West Java 
 Bandung

 Bogor

Central Java 
 Semarang

 Purwokerto

 Kebumen

 Pati

 Pekalongan

 Surakarta

Special Region of Yogyakarta

East Java 
 Surabaya

 Batu

 Malang

 Sidoarjo

 Madiun

 Kediri

 Blitar

 Tulungagung

Bali

East Kalimantan 
 Samarinda

 Balikpapan

 Bontang

North Kalimantan 
 Tarakan

South Sulawesi 
 Makassar

 Gowa

 Palopo

 Parepare

 Sinjai

North Sulawesi 
 Manado

 Tomohon

Papua 
 Jayapura

See also 
 Television in Indonesia

Notes

References

External links 
Asia Waves.Net Indonesian TV Page
Indonesia local TV
Indonesian Local TV Schedules
Complete TV Schedules

 
 
Television in Indonesia
Stations
Indonesia